Dongodytes is a genus of beetles in the family Carabidae, first described by Thierry Deuve in 1993.

Species 
Dongodytes contains the following thirteen species:
 Dongodytes baxian Tian, 2011
 Dongodytes brevipenis Tian, Yin & Huang, 2014
 Dongodytes deharvengi Tian, 2011
 Dongodytes elongatus Tian, Yin & Huang, 2014
 Dongodytes fowleri Deuve, 1993
 Dongodytes giraffa Deuve, 2005
 Dongodytes grandis Ueno, 1998
 Dongodytes inexpectatus Tian, Yin & Huang, 2014
 Dongodytes jinzhuensis Tian, Yin & Huang, 2014
 Dongodytes lani Tian, Yin & Huang, 2014
 Dongodytes tonywhitteni Yang, Huang & Tian, 2018
 Dongodytes troglodytes Tian, Yin & Huang, 2014
 Dongodytes yaophilus Tian, Yin & Huang, 2014

References

Trechinae